All 62 members of the Wyoming House of Representatives were elected on November 8, 2022, as part of the 2022 Wyoming elections. Primary elections were held on August 16. Republicans expanded their supermajority, gaining six seats.

Background 
The election will be the first after redistricting based on the 2020 census. New legislative districts were approved on March 25, 2022. Two seats were added in the redistricting plan enacted by the Wyoming Legislature.

Predictions

Results summary

Close races

Incumbents defeated in general

Democrats
District 17: Chad Banks lost to Republican J. T. Larson
District 33: Andi LeBeau lost to Republican Sarah Penn

Libertarian
District 39: Marshall Burt lost to Republican Cody Wylie

Open seats changing parties
District 22: Republican Andrew Byron won the seat held by retiring independent Jim Roscoe
District 61: Republican Daniel Singh won the new seat
District 62: Republican Forrest Chadwick won the new seat

Primary elections 
Major party (Republican and Democratic) candidates filed for the August 16 primary elections between May 12 and May 27, 2022. Minor parties (Libertarian and Constitution) nominated candidates by convention and submitted their nominations to the secretary of state by August 15. Independents submitted nominating petitions by August 29. The general election candidates list was finalized on September 6; the Democrats made one substitution.

Retiring incumbents

Republicans 
District 3: Eric Barlow (speaker; running for state senator)
District 7: Sue Wilson
District 19: Danny Eyre
District 21: Evan Simpson
District 25: Dan Laursen
District 26: Jamie Flitner
District 27: Mike Greear (speaker pro tempore)
District 29: Mark Kinner
District 42: Jim Blackburn
District 47: Jerry Paxton
District 49: Robert Wharff
District 52: Bill Fortner
District 57: Chuck Gray (running for secretary of state)
District 60: Mark Baker

Democrats
District 13: Cathy Connolly (minority leader)
District 23: Andy Schwartz

Independents
District 22: Jim Roscoe

Incumbents defeated in primary

Republicans
District 2: J. D. Williams
District 5: Shelly Duncan
District 6: Aaron Clausen
District 32: Timothy Hallinan
District 35: Joe MacGuire
District 44: John Romero-Martinez
District 58: Pat Sweeney

Democrats
None of the five Democrats running for re-election faced a primary challenge.

Results 
Percentages may not sum to 100 due to rounding and the inclusion of write-ins.

General election 
The general election was held on November 8.

District 1

District 2

District 3

District 4
Independent Dan Brecht challenged incumbent Republican representative Jeremy Haroldson.

District 5
Republican Scott Smith and independent Todd Peterson ran.

District 6
Republican Tomi Strock, Democrat Hank Szramkowski (who was substituted for primary winner Tania Malone), and independent Bruce Jones ran.

District 7

District 8
Independent LCCC Board of Trustees member Brenda Lyttle challenged former Republican representative David Zwonitzer of District 9.

District 9

District 10

District 11

District 12

District 13

District 14

District 15
Libertarian Patrick Gonzales challenged incumbent Republican representative Donald Burkhart.

District 16

District 17

District 18
Libertarian Dennis Laughlin challenged incumbent Republican representative Scott Heiner.

District 19

District 20

District 21

District 22
Independent Bob Strobel and Republican Andrew Byron ran to succeed retiring independent Jim Roscoe, who endorsed Strobel.

District 23

District 24

District 25

District 26

District 27

District 28

District 29

District 30

District 31

District 32

District 33

District 34

District 35

District 36

District 37

District 38

District 39
Incumbent Libertarian representative Marshall Burt sought re-election.

District 40

District 41
Democrat Jen Solis and Constitution nominee Matt Freeman challenged incumbent Republican representative Bill Henderson.

District 42

District 43

District 44

District 45

District 46

District 47

District 48
Libertarian Misty Morris challenged incumbent Republican representative Clark Stith.

District 49

District 50
Libertarian Carrie Satterwhite challenged incumbent Republican representative Rachel Rodriguez-Williams.

District 51

District 52

District 53
Constitution nominee Larry Williamson challenged incumbent Republican representative Chris Knapp.

District 54
Independent candidate Jeff Martin challenged incumbent Republican representative Lloyd Larsen.

District 55
Libertarian Bethany Baldes challenged incumbent Republican representative Ember Oakley.

District 56

District 57

District 58

District 59

District 60

District 61

District 62

Notes

References 

2022 Wyoming elections
Wyoming House of Representatives elections
Wyoming House